Hendrika Van Gelder (1870–1943) was a Dutch painter known for portraits and still lifes.

Biography
van Gelder was born on 7 May 1870 in Amsterdam. Around 1933 she moved into an artist studio in the Zomerdijkstraat.

Her work was included in the 1939 exhibition and sale Onze Kunst van Heden'' (Our Art of Today) at the Rijksmuseum in Amsterdam.

In 1943 van Gelder was deported to Sobibor, Poland where she died on 7 May 1943 in the Sobibor extermination camp.

References

External links
photos of Hendrika van Gelder on Joods Monument

1870 births
1943 deaths
Artists from Amsterdam
Dutch women artists
Dutch people who died in Sobibor extermination camp
20th-century Dutch women